Scales of Justice is an Australian crime drama miniseries directed by Michael Jenkins. It first screened on the Australian Broadcasting Corporation in 1983. It was one of the most controversial Australian mini-series ever produced, examining corruption in all levels of law enforcement.

Scales of Justice is composed of three self-contained, character-linked dramas. Focusing on the world of Australian law enforcement, vice, drugs, politics and widespread corruption, from street level to the corridors of power, the programme was acclaimed for its a near-documentary level of realism. Robert Caswell, the writer of the series, expressed surprise at the criticism it received from police and press.

It was released on DVD in 2005, with a 227 minutes running time.

Act One — The Job
While investigating a break-in, Probationary Constable Leonard "Spider" Webber witnesses his senior officer stealing merchandise and is torn between loyalty to his team and his own conscience.

Cast
 Simon Burke as Probationary Constable Leonard "Spider" Webber
 John Hargreaves as Constable Borland
 Bill Hunter as Sergeant O'Rourke
 Isabelle Anderson as Constable Callahan

Act Two — The Game
Detective Sergeants Ken Draffin and Mike Miles allow their integrity to be compromised by big-time criminal "Nipper" Jackson.

Cast
 Dennis Miller as Detective Sergeant Ken Draffin
 Tim Robertson as Detective Sergeant Mick Miles
 Tony Barry as Garth "Nipper" Jackson
 Don Reid as Assistant Commissioner Phillip Thompson
 Brian McDermott as Police Minister Ralph Carpenter

Act Three — The Numbers
A young attorney general's actions bring him into conflict with police, senior politicians and major crime bosses.

Cast
 Nick Tate as Glenn Ferris, the State Attorney General
 Richard Meikle as Russell Cooper, the State Premier
 John Meillon as Barry Barnes, the Deputy State Premier
 Kris McQuade as Kate Hardman
 Max Cullen as Arthur Roach
 Frank Wilson as Sir John Ritchie

See also
 List of Australian television series

References

External links

Scales of Justice at Australian Screen Online
Scales of Justice at AustLit
Scales of Justice at Australian Television

Australian drama television series
1980s Australian television miniseries
Australian Broadcasting Corporation original programming
1983 Australian television series debuts
1983 Australian television series endings